The American Society of Overseas Research (ASOR), founded in 1900 as the American School of Oriental Study and Research in Palestine, is a non-profit 501(c)(3) organization based in Alexandria, Virginia which supports the research and teaching of the history and cultures of the Near East and Middle Eastern countries. ASOR supports scholarship, research, exploration, and archeological fieldwork and offers avenues of disseminating this research through their publications. ASOR also provides support for undergraduates and graduates in institutions of higher education around the world pursuing studies of the history and cultures of the Near and Middle East.

As of January 2020, Sharon Herbert, is the president of ASOR. Her predecessor, Susan Ackerman served as President from 2014-2019.

ASOR collaborates with the following independent overseas institutes:
 Albright Institute of Archaeological Research, Jerusalem – former directors of which include Millar Burrows who was instrumental in the first publications of the Dead Sea scrolls.
 Cyprus American Archaeological Research Institute, Nicosia.
 American Center of Research, Amman.
The overseas institutes support scholars working in the Middle East that focus on Near Eastern Archaeology, Semitic languages, history, Biblical studies, among a variety of other fields. The institutes are also members of the Council of American Overseas Research Centers.

Annual conference
ASOR convenes a scholarly conference once a year in North America, always beginning 8 days before Thanksgiving (on a Wednesday evening) and running through Saturday evening.

2008 – Boston, MA and drew over 730 scholars and interested lay members from around the world.

2009 – New Orleans, LA.

2018 – Denver, CO.

2019 – San Diego, CA.

2020 – Virtual

2021 – Chicago, IL

Publications
ASOR also publishes three  scholarly publications. University of Chicago Press began publishing all three ASOR journals in 2019. Two of the journals are academic flagships in their respective areas:
Bulletin of the American Schools of Oriental Research presents archaeological, historical, and epigraphic articles on topics from the ancient Near East
Journal of Cuneiform Studies presents articles in English, German, and French on Mesopotamian topics.

The organization also publishes
Near Eastern Archaeology, a quarterly that reports recent research for both popular and professional audiences.
The Ancient Near East Today (ANE Today or ANET) is a monthly e-newsletter, informing registered "Friends of ASOR" about new discoveries and ideas from its field of activity.

Sources

 King, Philip J.  American Archaeology in the Mideast: A History of the American Schools of Oriental Research (1983).
 Clark, D.G. and V.H. Matthews 100 Years of American Archaeology in the Middle East: Proceedings of the American Schools of Oriental Research Centennial Celebration (2003).

External links
 American Society of Overseas Research (ASOR)

Affiliated Independent Institutes
 W. F. Albright Institute of Archaeological Research (AIAR) Jerusalem, Israel
 American Center of Research (ACOR) Amman, Jordan
 Cyprus American Archaeological Research Institute (CAARI) Nicosia, Cyprus

Archaeological organizations
Archaeological research institutes
International research institutes
Educational institutions established in 1900
Ancient Near East organizations
Council of American Overseas Research Centers
1900 establishments in the Ottoman Empire